Last Word Spoken is the second album by punk rock band One Man Army, which was released in 2000 through Adeline Records.

Track listing
 "The Old Songs" - 2:44
 "No Controlling" - 2:16
 "Bootlegger's Son" - 2:22
 "Another Night" - 2:32
 "All Your Friends" - 2:28
 "Until Now" - 2:06
 "The Lonely Road Nowhere" - 2:52
 "Join the Ranks" - 2:03
 "The Tune of the Leisure Pace" - 1:52
 "Looming Disaster" - 3:07
 "Red Light's Tinge" - 1:29
 "Last Word Spoken" - 2:32
 "The Holidays" - 2:47

Adeline Records albums
One Man Army (band) albums
2000 albums